Brubeck à la mode is 1960 studio album by pianist Dave Brubeck and his quartet.

The album comprises compositions by the clarinetist Bill Smith; this was one of three albums that Brubeck and his quartet made with Smith.

In Todd R. Decker's 2014 book Who Should Sing Ol' Man River?: The Lives of an American Song, Decker wrote that the album cover of Brubeck à la mode shows the "...smiling quartet sharing ice cream sodas at a picture-perfect ice cream fountain". Decker wrote how the cover frames the album within the context of the contemporaneous Civil Rights Movement; especially the Greensboro sit-ins and Nashville sit-ins which also took place at lunch counters.

Reception

Scott Yanow reviewed the album for Allmusic and wrote that "The music generally swings and there are some fine solos but none of the individual pieces are all that memorable".

Billboard magazine reviewed the album in their January 16, 1961 issue and wrote that "The music is swinging, alive and comes from Smith's pen. Brubeck plays simply and movingly on these sides as do the members of his group."

Track listing
All compositions by Bill Smith except otherwise noted:
 "Dorican Dance" – 3:28
 "Peace, Brother!" (Eddie DeLange, Jimmy Van Heusen, Bill Smith) – 3:55
 "Invention" – 4:57
 "Lydian Line" – 5:25
 "Catch-Me-If-You-Can" – 1:45
 "Frisco Fog" – 6:01
 "The Piper" – 2:47
 "Soliloquy" – 3:26
 "One for the Kids" – 3:11
 "Ballade" – 3:58

Personnel
 Dave Brubeck - piano
 Bill Smith - clarinet
 Eugene Wright - double bass
 Joe Morello - drums
Technical
Bob Willoughby - cover photography

See also
 Civil rights movement in popular culture

References

1960 albums
Civil rights movement in popular culture
Dave Brubeck albums
Fantasy Records albums
Instrumental albums